James Patrick Romero Bondoc (born May 31, 1975), known professionally as Jimmy Bondoc, is a Filipino musician and songwriter best known for composing his songs Let Me Be The One and Hanggang Dito Nalang.

In 2021, he was named as a member of the Board of Directors of Philippine Amusement and Gaming Corporation (PAGCOR). Previously, he served as the vice-president for community relations of the corporation from 2017 to 2021 and as assistant vice-president in the Entertainment Department of the said corporation from 2016 to 2017.

Personal life
Bondoc studied at the Ateneo de Manila University from elementary to college, with a degree of Bachelor of Arts in Communications.

In 2017, he started studying law at San Beda University. In 2019, he transferred to University of the East to continue his law studies.

Music career
Bondoc is an acoustic musician and has also composed and produced songs. Bondoc is known for his original hits "The Man I Was With You", "Akin Na Lang Sana Siya" and his biggest hit, "Let Me Be The One."

In 2002, he founded Magis Productions, where he also served as its president until 2016.

In 2009, Bondoc released his album entitled "Walang Araw, Walang Ulan under the Sony-BMG.

In 2010, the album Ang Mahiwagang Bisikleta at Ang Huling Makata was released.

Bondoc became a resident juror on the Philippine adaptation of the Sing If You Can franchise, Twist and Shout. Bondoc has also served as a regular celebrity mentor on It's Showtime.

Bondoc was also a radio host for The RnB Show at 97.9 Natural (now known as 97.9 Home Radio) with Duncan Ramos until the end of 2014. He is also part of the band called the Sabado Boys alongside Luke Mejares, Paolo Santos and Dj Myke.

In 2015, Bondoc was among the showbiz personalities who campaigned for Rodrigo Duterte's successful presidential candidacy. He composed the song "Takbo" (Run), performed by various OPM artists who supported him, to seek the then-Davao City Mayor Duterte to officially run for president at that time.

PAGCOR 
In July 2016, Bondoc has been appointed as the Assistant Vice President for Entertainment of the Philippine Amusement and Gaming Corporation (PAGCOR), replacing Bong Quintaña. His appointment did not come without criticisms as citizens questioned his qualifications for the post. He later served as PAGCOR’s vice president for Corporate Social Responsibility (CSR) Group from October 2017 to July 2021.

On September 10, 2021, he was named as a member of the Board of Directors of Philippine Amusement and Gaming Corporation (PAGCOR), serving to complete the unfinished term of the late Director Reynaldo Concordia. He took on September 15 by an official in Barangay Pinagkaisahan, Quezon City and would serve until June 30, 2022. There are no latest updates on his reappointment in 2022.

Palit-Bise rally 
In April 2017, Bondoc, also a critic of Vice President Leni Robredo, was one of the organizers of "Palit-Bise" rally held at Rizal Park in Manila. Held by pro-Duterte supporters, the Philippine National Police estimated that the crowd numbered only to 4,500 in comparison with the millions who voted for Duterte. The rally was said to be funded by donations coming from OFW supporters of the president through the Gava Gives online platform. There were questions were raised if collected funds were taxable. On March 28, 2017, in a press conference prior to the rally, there were reported instances of bloggers and journalists receiving "gas money", for those who took public transport to go to the press conference.

ABS-CBN franchise renewal 
In May 2019, Bondoc posted his sentiments on the impending end of ABS-CBN's legislative franchise, typing "I AM EAGERLY AWAITING YOUR DEMISE".

On June 12, 2019, Bondoc celebrated the news of the House of Representatives freezing discussions on renewal of the media company's legislative franchise.

2022 elections 
During the 2022 election campaign period, Bondoc showed support to the presidential bid of his fellow celebrity, Manila Mayor Isko Moreno. He was also seen performing at Moreno's campaign rally.

Personal life 
In 2005, Bondoc had a relationship with the Filipina singer Nina. It also have faced disputes with Nyoy Volante.

On August 2, 2022, a fire razed his studio, damaging musical instruments and equipment worth .

Awards

References

External links
Official Website

Jimmy Bondoc Abouts

1975 births
Living people
Ateneo de Manila University alumni
Filipino radio personalities
20th-century Filipino male singers
Filipino television personalities
Filipino male pop singers
21st-century Filipino male singers
Star Music artists
Duterte administration personnel